Marlon Forrester (born 1976, Georgetown, Guyana, South America) is a painter, artist, and educator raised in Boston, MA. He is a graduate of School of the Museum of Fine Arts Boston, B.A. 2008 and Yale School of Art, M.F.A. 2010.

References 
 https://www.bostonglobe.com/arts/2012/06/07/playoff-forrester-explores-race-basketball-and-objectification/Eyz5BwtHqv5IODG7JIjQjP/story.html 
 https://web.archive.org/web/20160303212821/http://www.catemcquaid.com/?p=1201
 http://www.marlonforrester.com

Artists from Boston
1976 births
Living people
20th-century American painters
American male painters
21st-century American painters
21st-century American male artists
Guyanese painters
Guyanese emigrants to the United States
20th-century American male artists